Hahn's Shoes was a Washington, DC area shoe store. It was founded in 1876 by William Hahn, who had arrived in the United States from Germany in 1868 at age 15. By 1890, there were three locations: 816 7th St, NW; 1922 Pennsylvania Ave, NW; and 231 Pennsylvania Ave, SE.

Hahn Shoes continued to expand. At its peak, it had 66 stores in 13 states and DC. Three generations of the Hahn family, including the father of DC City Council Chair Gilbert Hahn Jr., managed the business until 1984. William Hahn's granddaughter, Betty Hahn Bernbaum, was a radio operator and ambassador's wife in South America in the mid-twentieth century.

Like Rich's and other locally owned shoe stores, Hahn's was unable to keep up with the prices of discount chains and department stores. After 119 years, the business filed for bankruptcy and liquidated in 1995.

References 
  Hahn Shoes Chain for Sale after 119 Years in District: Washington Post
 Black Friday Then and Now: Greater Greater Washington

Retail companies established in 1876
Retail companies disestablished in 1995
Shoe companies of the United States
Defunct companies based in Washington, D.C.
1876 establishments in Washington, D.C.
1995 disestablishments in Washington, D.C.